In enzymology, a phosphatidyl-N-methylethanolamine N-methyltransferase is an enzyme that catalyzes the chemical reaction

S-adenosyl-L-methionine + phosphatidyl-N-methylethanolamine  S-adenosyl-L-homocysteine + phosphatidyl-N-dimethylethanolamine

Thus, the two substrates of this enzyme are S-adenosyl methionine and phosphatidyl-N-methylethanolamine, whereas its two products are S-adenosylhomocysteine and phosphatidyl-N-dimethylethanolamine.

This enzyme belongs to the family of transferases, specifically those transferring one-carbon group methyltransferases.  The systematic name of this enzyme class is S-adenosyl-L-methionine:phosphatidyl-N-methylethanolamine N-methyltransferase. Other names in common use include phosphatidylmonomethylethanolamine methyltransferase, methyltransferase II, phospholipid methyltransferase, PLMT, phosphatidyl-N-methylethanolamine methyltransferase, phosphatidyl-N-monomethylethanolamine methyltransferase, phosphatidylethanolamine methyltransferase I, and phosphatidylmonomethylethanolamine methyltransferase.  This enzyme participates in glycine, serine and threonine metabolism and glycerophospholipid metabolism.

References

 
 

EC 2.1.1
Enzymes of unknown structure